A bid bond is issued as part of a supply bidding process by the contractor to the project owner, to provide guarantee, that the winning bidder will undertake the contract under the terms at which they bid.

The cash deposit is subject to full or partial forfeiture if the winning contractor fails to either execute the contract or provide the required performance and/or payment bonds. The bid bond assures and guarantees that should the bidder be successful, the bidder will execute the contract and provide the required surety bonds.

Details 

A bid bond of amount not above 10% of the contract order total amount is deposited when a contractor, also known as the “supplier" or "principal", is bidding on a tendered contract. The bid bond prequalifies the principal and provides the necessary security to the owner (or general contractor), also known as the “obligee”. This helps to avoid frivolous bids and guarantees that the principal will enter into the contract if it is awarded.

A bid bond guarantees that the “obligee” will be paid the difference between the principal's tender price and the next closest tender price. This action is only triggered should the principal be awarded the contract but fails to enter into the contract, as agreed, with the obligee. The bid bond penalty is generally ten percent of the bidder's tender price.

Contractors prefer the use of bid bonds because they are a less expensive option and they do not tie up cash or bank credit lines during the bidding process. Owners and general contractors also use bid bonds because they establish and confirm that the bidding contractor or supplier is qualified to undertake the project.

References

Bonds (finance)